The Roman Catholic Diocese of Mweka is a Latin suffragan diocese in the Ecclesiastical province of The Metropolitan of Kananga in the Democratic Republic of the Congo, it depends on the missionary Roman Congregation for the Evangelization of Peoples.

Its cathedral episcopal see is the Cathédrale Saint-Martin, in the city of Mweka in Kasai Province.

Statistics 
As per 2014, it pastorally served 346,580 Catholics (41.2% of 840,645 total) on 21,700 km² in 14 parishes with 43 priests (32 diocesan, 11 religious), 34 lay religious (21 brothers, 13 sisters) and 35 seminarians.

History 
 Established on 1953.03.24 as Apostolic Prefecture of Mweka, on territory split off from the then Apostolic Vicariate of Luluabourg
 Promoted on September 29, 1964 as Diocese of Mweka.

Ordinaries 
(all Latin Rite)

Apostolic Prefects of Mweka  
 Apostolic administrator Bernard Mels, Scheutists (C.I.C.M.), while Titular Bishop of Belali (1949.03.10 – 1959.11.10) & Apostolic Vicar of Luluabourg (Congo-Kinshasa) (1949.03.10 – 1959.11.10), later promoted that see's first Metropolitan Archbishop (1959.11.10 – 1967.09.26), then Archbishop-Bishop of Lwiza (Congo-Kinshasa) (1967.09.26 –  retired 1970.10.03), emeritate as Titular Archbishop of Pulcheriopolis (1970.10.03 – resigned 1986.05.17), died 1992
 Marcel Evariste van Rengen, Josephites of Belgium (C.I.) (1957 – 1964.09.29 see below)

Suffragan Bishops of Mweka
 Marcel Evariste van Rengen, C.I. (see above 1964.09.29 – death 1988.03.15)
 Apostolic administrator Emery Kabongo Kanundowi  (1988 – 1989.01.19), while Archbishop-Bishop of Luebo (Congo-Kinshasa) (1987.12.10 – retired 2003.08.14); previously Second Private Secretary of the Pope (1982 – 1987.12.10)
 Gérard Mulumba Kalemba (1989.01.19 - 2017.02.18), died April 15, 2020
 Oscar Nkolo Kanowa, Scheutists (C.I.C.M.) (2017.02.18 – ...)

See also 
 List of Roman Catholic dioceses in the Democratic Republic of the Congo
 Roman Catholicism in the Democratic Republic of the Congo

Sources and external links 
 GCatholic.org, with incumbent biography links and Google satellite photo
 Catholic Hierarchy

Roman Catholic dioceses in the Democratic Republic of the Congo
Christian organizations established in 1953
Roman Catholic dioceses and prelatures established in the 20th century
1953 establishments in the Belgian Congo
Roman Catholic Ecclesiastical Province of Kananga